Caves of Qud is an early access roguelike role-playing video game set in an open world that is partially pre-made and partially randomly generated. The game takes place in a post-apocalyptic science fantasy setting and is inspired by the pen-and-paper role-playing games Gamma World and Dungeons & Dragons.

Gameplay 
Contrary to other traditional roguelikes, the game has a quest system as a core mechanic, with some of these quests being scripted, while others are procedurally generated. Players can choose to follow the main questline, but can also choose to ignore it and play the game without following the pre-written plot. When creating a character, the player can select either a "True Kin" (unmutated humans) who have higher base stats and access to cybernetic augmentations, or a mutant that has access to both physical and mental mutations that offer a wide degree of utility. The default starting location is the pre-made town of Joppa, but it is also possible to choose to spawn in one of the many procedurally generated towns.

The game has "deeply simulated physical and political systems" which are randomly generated and different each session. It generates a set of historical events and group relationships mostly centered around a set of five randomly generated ancient rulers, dubbed Sultans. It takes inspiration from the history systems of the games Dwarf Fortress and Epitaph. Instead of having historical events being generated without bias, its procedural history system is based around historical accounts, like word of mouth and ancient texts.

Reception 
While some rated the game as being more accessible compared to other roguelikes, other reviews found the game's interface confusing and were deterred by the lack of an in-depth tutorial.

References

External links
 

2015 video games
Roguelike video games
Role-playing video games
Linux games
MacOS games
Video games with textual graphics
Windows games